CKY may refer to:

CKY (band), American rock band, formerly "Camp Kill Yourself"
CKY (video series), named after the band
CKY crew, people involved in the video series and related projects
CKY-DT, a television station in Winnipeg, Manitoba, Canada
CKY-FM, an FM radio station in Winnipeg, Canada
CKY-FM, former callsign of CITI-FM radio station, Winnipeg, Canada
CKY, former radio station, Winnipeg, Canada, later CBW (AM) 
CYK algorithm or Cocke–Younger–Kasami algorithm, usually CYK but sometimes CKY
Conakry International Airport, IATA code
Po Leung Kuk Choi Kai Yau School a private school in Hong Kong